Devin Scillian (born January 11, 1963) is an American television journalist, musician and children's author.

Broadcast career

While still a student at the University of Kansas, Scillian began his television career at WIBW-TV in Topeka, Kansas.  After graduating from the William Allen White School of Journalism at Kansas, Scillian worked from 1985 to 1986 at WAND-TV in Decatur, Illinois.  He spent the next three years as the main anchor at KLTV in Tyler, Texas, before moving to KFOR in Oklahoma City in 1989. He joined WDIV as a reporter in 1995, and took an anchor position in 1996.

Scillian has appeared as a television journalist in several films, including Scream 4, The Double, and Mooz-lum, as well as a recurring role on The Ellen DeGeneres Show as a news anchor in a "Breaking News" skit.

Books
His 21 books include A Is For America (2001), Fibblestax (2000), and Memoirs of a Goldfish (2010). He has co-written two books with his wife, Corey.  One Kansas Farmer illustrated by Doug Bowles, was released in 2009.  Their previous book, S Is For Sunflower, won the Bill Martin, Jr. Picture Book Award in 2007. His most recent book is A Parliament of Owls illustrated by Sam Caldwell (2022).

Music
Scillian has released four albums of his original country music. He won the Detroit Music Award for Best Country Vocalist in 2018 and Best Country Performer in 2001. He and his band Arizona Son make frequent appearances at summer music festivals. They've opened for the likes of Toby Keith, Reba McEntire and LeAnn Rimes.

Discography
Argentina (1995)
Tulsa (2000)
A is for America (2001)
Letter from London (2016)

Publications
Fibblestax (2000)
A is for America (2001)
One Nation: America by the Numbers (2002)
P is for Passport (2003)
Cosmo's Moon (2003)
S is for Sooner (2003)
S is for Sunflower (2004)
H is for Honor (2006)
Pappy's Handkerchief (2007)
Brewster the Rooster (2007)
One Kansas Farmer: A Kansas Number Book (2009)
Memoirs of a Goldfish (2010)
D is for Down Under: An Australia Alphabet (2010)
Westward Journeys (2013)
Memoirs of a Hamster (2013)
Johnny Kaw: A Tall Tale (2013)
Memoirs of an Elf (2014)
Memoirs of a Parrot (2016)
Mistletoe: A Very Confused Christmas (2017)
Back Roads Country Toads (2019)
Memoirs of a Tortoise  (2020)
A Parliament of Owls  (2022)

Filmography
Scream 4 (2011) - Reporter #3
Mooz-lum (2011) - News broadcaster
The Double (2011) - Newscaster

References

External links
 Devin Scillian's website

1963 births
American children's writers
American television news anchors
American television reporters and correspondents
Living people
Writers from Detroit
Writers from Topeka, Kansas
People from Grosse Pointe Park, Michigan